Fort Deposit is a town in Lowndes County, Alabama, United States. Since 1890, it has been the largest town in Lowndes County. At the 2010 census the population was 1,344, up from 1,270 in 2000. It is part of the Montgomery Metropolitan Statistical Area.

This town is named after a fort that was built under the order of General Andrew Jackson. This was a supply fort that was built to serve the soldiers during the Creek Indian War. There is an annual arts and crafts fair called Calico Fort on the second weekend of April every year.

It was incorporated on February 13, 1891. It reportedly sits on the highest point of land between Montgomery and New Orleans, Louisiana.

Geography
Fort Deposit is located at  (31.987872, -86.571249).

Climate
According to the Köppen climate classification, Fort Deposit has a humid subtropical climate (abbreviated Cfa).

Demographics

2010 census
At the 2010 census there were 1,344 people, 512 households, and 348 families in the town. The racial makeup of the town was 75.5% Black or African American, 23.7% White and 0.6% from two or more races. 0.4% of the population were Hispanic or Latino of any race.
Of the 512 households 28.9% had children under the age of 18 living with them, 34.8% were married couples living together, 29.3% had a female householder with no husband present, and 32.0% were non-families. 28.9% of households were one person and 11.2% were one person aged 65 or older. The average household size was 2.63 and the average family size was 3.28.

The age distribution was 29.5% under the age of 18, 9.6% from 18 to 24, 22.1% from 25 to 44, 26.6% from 45 to 64, and 12.2% 65 or older. The median age was 34.3 years. For every 100 females, there were 86.9 males. For every 100 women age 18 and over, there were 76.7 men.

The median household income was $30,000 and the median family income  was $31,591. Males had a median income of $41,579 versus $25,341 for females. The per capita income for the town was $14,411. About 19.4% of families and 22.2% of the population were below the poverty line, including 43.6% of those under age 18 and 25.4% of those age 65 or over.

2000 Census
At the 2000 census there were 1,270 people, 489 households, and 349 families in the town. The racial makeup of the town was 68.19% Black or African American, 31.50% White and 0.31% from two or more races. 0.47% of the population were Hispanic or Latino of any race.
Of the 489 households 35.0% had children under the age of 18 living with them, 39.3% were married couples living together, 27.4% had a female householder with no husband present, and 28.6% were non-families. 25.6% of households were one person and 9.6% were one person aged 65 or older. The average household size was 2.60 and the average family size was 3.12.

The age distribution was 29.8% under the age of 18, 8.6% from 18 to 24, 27.1% from 25 to 44, 21.7% from 45 to 64, and 12.8% 65 or older. The median age was 35 years. For every 100 females, there were 86.2 males. For every 100 women age 18 and over, there were 83.0 men.

The median household income was $20,433 and the median family income  was $24,250. Males had a median income of $27,391 versus $20,882 for females. The per capita income for the town was $12,584. About 29.8% of families and 35.3% of the population were below the poverty line, including 42.8% of those under age 18 and 34.2% of those age 65 or over.

Notable people
 Richard Williamson, former NFL head coach (Tampa Bay Buccaneers)
 Ed Bell (musician) (country blues singer and guitarist)

Gallery

References

External links
 Welcome To Fort Deposit

Towns in Lowndes County, Alabama
Towns in Alabama
Creek War
Montgomery metropolitan area